The turbofan engine market is dominated by General Electric, Rolls-Royce plc and Pratt & Whitney, in order of market share. General Electric and Safran of France have a joint venture, CFM International. Pratt & Whitney also have a joint venture, International Aero Engines with Japanese Aero Engine Corporation and MTU Aero Engines of Germany, specializing in engines for the Airbus A320 family. Pratt & Whitney and General Electric have a joint venture, Engine Alliance selling a range of engines for aircraft such as the Airbus A380.

For airliners and cargo aircraft, the in-service fleet in 2016 is 60,000 engines and should grow to 103,000 in 2035 with 86,500 deliveries according to Flight Global. A majority will be medium-thrust engines for narrow-body aircraft with 54,000 deliveries, for a fleet growing from 28,500 to 61,000. High-thrust engines for wide-body aircraft, worth 40–45% of the market by value, will grow from 12,700 engines to over 21,000 with 18,500 deliveries. The regional jet engines below 20,000 lb (89 kN) fleet will grow from 7,500 to 9,000 and the fleet of turboprops for airliners will increase from 9,400 to 10,200. The manufacturers market share should be led by CFM with 44% followed by Pratt & Whitney with 29% and then Rolls-Royce and General Electric with 10% each.

General Electric

GE Aviation, part of the General Electric conglomerate, currently has the largest share of the turbofan engine market. Some of their engine models include the CF6 (available on the Boeing 767, Boeing 747, Airbus A330 and more), GE90 (only the Boeing 777) and GEnx (developed for the Boeing 747-8 & Boeing 787 Dreamliner and proposed for the Airbus A350) engines. On the military side, GE engines power many U.S. military aircraft, including the F110, powering 80% of the US Air Force's F-16 Fighting Falcons, and the F404 and F414 engines, which power the Navy's F/A-18 Hornet and Super Hornet. Rolls-Royce and General Electric were jointly developing the F136 engine to power the Joint Strike Fighter, however, due to government budget cuts, the program has been eliminated.

Rolls-Royce

Rolls-Royce  is the second largest manufacturer of turbofans and is most noted for their RB211 and Trent series, as well as their joint venture engines for the Airbus A320 and McDonnell Douglas MD-90 families (IAE V2500 with Pratt & Whitney and others), the Panavia Tornado (Turbo-Union RB199) and the Boeing 717 (BR700). The Rolls-Royce AE 3007, developed by Allison Engine Company before its acquisition by Rolls-Royce, powers several Embraer regional jets. Rolls-Royce Trent 970s were the first engines to power the new Airbus A380. The famous thrust vectoring Pegasus – actually a Bristol Siddeley design taken on by Rolls-Royce when they took over that company – is the primary powerplant of the Harrier "Jump Jet" and its derivatives.

Pratt & Whitney

Pratt & Whitney is third behind GE and Rolls-Royce in market share. The JT9D has the distinction of being chosen by Boeing to power the original Boeing 747 "Jumbo jet".  The PW4000 series is the successor to the JT9D, and powers some Airbus A310, Airbus A300, Boeing 747, Boeing 767, Boeing 777, Airbus A330 and MD-11 aircraft. The PW4000 is certified for 180-minute ETOPS when used in twinjets.  The first family has a  fan diameter and is designed to power the Boeing 767, Boeing 747, MD-11, and the Airbus A300. The second family is the 100 inch (2.5 m) fan engine developed specifically for the Airbus A330 twinjet, and the third family has a diameter of  designed to power Boeing 777.  The Pratt & Whitney F119 and its derivative, the F135, power the United States Air Force's F-22 Raptor and the international F-35 Lightning II, respectively. Rolls-Royce are responsible for the lift fan which provides the F-35B variants with a STOVL capability.  The F100 engine was first used on the F-15 Eagle and F-16 Fighting Falcon. Newer Eagles and Falcons also come with GE F110 as an option, and the two are in competition.

CFM International

CFM International is a joint venture between GE Aircraft Engines and SNECMA of France. They have created the very successful CFM56 series, used on Boeing 737, Airbus A340, and Airbus A320 family aircraft.

Engine Alliance

Engine Alliance is a 50/50 joint venture between General Electric and Pratt & Whitney formed in August 1996 to develop, manufacture, sell, and support a family of modern technology aircraft engines for new high-capacity, long-range aircraft. The main application for such an engine, the GP7200, was originally the Boeing 747-500/600X projects, before these were cancelled owing to lack of demand from airlines. Instead, the GP7000 has been re-optimised for use on the Airbus A380 superjumbo. In that market it is competing with the Rolls-Royce Trent 900, the launch engine for the aircraft. The two variants are the GP7270 and the GP7277.

GE Honda Aero Engines
GE Honda Aero Engines is a 50/50 joint venture between General Electric and Honda Aero, Inc. (HAI) formed in 2004, for the small size business jet market.  They currently have one engine, the GE Honda HF120, used on the Honda Aircraft Company's HA-420 HondaJet

International Aero Engines

International Aero Engines is a Zürich-registered joint venture between Pratt & Whitney, MTU Aero Engines and Japanese Aero Engine Corporation. The collaboration produced the V2500, the second most successful commercial jet engine program in production today in terms of volume, and the third most successful commercial jet engine program in aviation history.

Williams International

Williams International is a manufacturer of small gas turbine engines based in Walled Lake, Michigan, United States. It produces jet engines for cruise missiles and small jet-powered aircraft. They have been producing engines since the 1970s and the range produces between 1000 and 3600 pounds of thrust. The engines are used as original equipment on the Cessna CitationJet CJ1 through CJ4 and Cessna Mustang, Beechcraft 400XPR and Premier 1a and there are several development programs with other manufacturers. The range is also very popular with the re-engine market being used by Sierra Jet and Nextant to breathe new life into aging platforms.

Honeywell Aerospace

Honeywell Aerospace is one of the largest manufacturer of aircraft engines and avionics, as well as a producer of auxiliary power units (APUs) and other aviation products. Headquartered in Phoenix, Arizona, it is a division of the Honeywell International conglomerate. Honeywell/ITEC F124 series is used in military jets, such as the Aero L-159 Alca and the Alenia Aermacchi M-346. The Honeywell HTF7000 series is used in the Bombardier Challenger 300 and the Gulfstream G280. The ALF502 and LF507 turbofans are produced by a partnership between Honeywell and China's state-owned Industrial Development Corporation. The partnership is called the International Turbine Engine Co.

Aviadvigatel

Aviadvigatel is a Russian manufacturer of aircraft engines that succeeded the Soviet Soloviev Design Bureau. The company currently offers several versions of the Aviadvigatel PS-90 engine that powers Ilyushin Il-96-300/400/400T, Tupolev Tu-204, Tu-214 series and the Ilyushin Il-76-MD-90. The company is also developing the new Aviadvigatel PD-14 engine for the new Russian MS-21 airliner.

Ivchenko-Progress

Ivchenko-Progress is the Ukrainian aircraft engine company that succeeded the Soviet Ivchenko Design Bureau. Some of their engine models include Progress D-436 available on the Antonov An-72/74, Yakovlev Yak-42, Beriev Be-200, Antonov An-148 and Tupolev Tu-334 and Progress D-18T that powers two of the world's largest airplanes, Antonov An-124 and Antonov An-225.

Motor Sich

Motor-Sich currently produces the Ivchenko Progress D-18 turbofan which powers variants of the Antonov An-124 and An-225 freighters, although the Ivchenko Progress D-36/Ivchenko Progress D-436 series remain the highest production-rate engines in the CIS.

Motor Sich inherited some of the former Soviet Union's aero engine manufacturing capabilities. It produces turbofan, turboprop and rotary-wing turboshaft engines that power aircraft in Russian service, such as Mi- and Ka-series military helicopters.

NPO Saturn

NPO Saturn is a Russian aircraft engine manufacturer, formed from the mergers of Rybinsk and Lyul'ka-Saturn. Saturn's engines include Lyulka AL-31, Lyulka AL-41, NPO Saturn AL-55 and power many former Eastern Bloc aircraft, such as the Tupolev Tu-154. Saturn holds a 50% stake in the PowerJet joint venture with Snecma.

PowerJet

PowerJet is a 50–50 joint venture between Snecma (Safran) and NPO Saturn, created in July 2004. The company manufactures SaM146, the sole powerplant for the Sukhoi Superjet 100.

Klimov

Klimov was formed in the early 1930s to produce and improve upon the liquid-cooled Hispano-Suiza 12Y V-12 piston engine for which the USSR had acquired a license. Currently, Klimov is the manufacturer of the Klimov RD-33 turbofan engines.

EuroJet

EuroJet Turbo GmbH is a multi-national consortium, the partner companies of which are Rolls-Royce of the United Kingdom, Avio of Italy, ITP of Spain and MTU Aero Engines of Germany. Eurojet GmbH was formed in 1986 to manage the development, production, support, maintenance, support and sales of the EJ200 turbofan engine for the Eurofighter Typhoon.

Chinese turbofans

Three Chinese corporations build turbofan engines. Some of these are licensed or reverse engineered versions of European and Russian turbofans, and the other are indigenous models. Shenyang Aircraft Corporation (manufacturer of Shenyang WS-10), Xi'an Aero-Engine Corporation (manufacturer of Xian WS-15) and Guizhou Aircraft Industry Corporation (manufacturer of Guizhou WS-13) manufacture turbofans.

Japanese turbofans

Ishikawajima-Harima Heavy Industries is the Japan aircraft engine company. The company manufactures F3 for Kawasaki T-4, XF5-1 for ATD-X, F7 for Kawasaki P-1.

North Korean turbofans

Kumsong-3 is North Korean domestic variant/clone of Kh-35 that was utilized R95TP-300/MS-400 turbofan engine while improved model has comparable range to Kh-35U that is utilizing TRDD-50 turbofan engine.

North Korea tested land attack cruise missile that demonstrated 1500 kilometer range and touted development of new turbofan engine.

Iranian turbofans
Iranian made Jahesh-700 light turbofan engine is similar to Williams FJ33 or Williams FJ44.

Indian Gas Turbine Research Establishment (GTRE)
Gas Turbine Research Establishment is owned by DRDO of Government of India. It produced the GTRE GTX-35VS Kaveri turbofan intended to power HAL Tejas and HAL Advanced Medium Combat Aircraft being built by the Aeronautical Development Agency.

Turkish turbofans
Tusaş Engine Industries (TEI) developed and manufactured Türkiye's first indigenous turbofan TEI-TF6000, with 6,000 lbf dry thrust. An afterburner version, TF-10000, is under development to provide 10,000 lbf thrust intended to be used on the Kizilelma UCAV.

Gallery

Commercial turbofans in production

References

Jet engines